2014–15 in women's Cyclo-cross covers the 2014–15 Cyclo-cross season, which bridges the 2014 and 2015 road cycling seasons and mirrors the men's 2014–15 cyclo-cross season. The Cyclo-cross season consists of three major international race series, along with the World Championships. Cyclo-cross, like road cycling, is governed by the UCI.

World Championships

UCI Cyclo-cross World Cup

Cyclo-cross Superprestige

BPost Bank Trophy

Other races

Results Source:
Calendar Source:

Continental Championships

National Championships

See also
For men's Cyclo-cross see: 2014–15 cyclo-cross season

References

2014 in cyclo-cross
Cyclo-cross by year
2015 in cyclo-cross